HMS Alligator was a 28-gun  sixth rate of the Royal Navy. She was launched at Cochin, British India on 29 March 1821.

Alligator, under the command of Captain Lambert, operated in New Zealand during 1834, leaving on 31 March 1834, but returned again in September the same year to rescue the crew and passengers of Harriet, which was wrecked near Cape Egmont, Taranaki and were held by the Ngāti Ruanui.

In March 1834, Alligator, was on hand (and fired the 13-gun salute) at the first hoisting of the first national flag of New Zealand, at Waitangi, Bay of Islands.

She eventually became a depot ship at Trincomalee in June 1841, and was then converted to a troopship in July 1842. Alligator was finally hulked as seamen’s hospital at Hong Kong in December 1846.

Fate
She was sold at Hong Kong on 30 October 1865.

Footnotes

References

External links

 

1821 ships
Atholl-class corvettes
First Opium War ships of the United Kingdom
Ships built in India